Josef Arneth (13 October 1873, in Burgkunstadt – 1955) was a German physician and haematologist known for naming the Arneth count.

He studied medicine at universities in Munich, Heidelberg and Würzburg, qualifying in 1897. He subsequently worked in Würzburg before becoming professor of medicine in Münster in 1907, a position he held until 1944. He was an active researcher in haematology and published various books on the subject of pulmonary diseases and blood.

External links 
 

1873 births
1955 deaths
People from Lichtenfels (district)
German hematologists